All Elite Wrestling (AEW) is an American professional wrestling promotion based in Jacksonville, Florida, and is considered the second largest wrestling promotion in the United States behind WWE. Title reigns are either determined by professional wrestling matches or are awarded to a wrestler as a result of the culmination of various scripted storylines. 

There are currently eight championships in AEW. There are four singles championships, one traditional tag team championship, and one six-man tag team championship for male wrestlers, while there are two singles championships for female wrestlers. Championships from AEW's sister promotion Ring of Honor are also currently promoted in AEW; its champions can be found at the Ring of Honor article.

This list includes the number of times the wrestler has held the title, the date and location of the win, and a description of the winning bout.

Overview
The American professional wrestling promotion All Elite Wrestling (AEW) promotes several professional wrestling championships for its men's and women's divisions. AEW often broadcasts championship matches on their weekly television programs, Wednesday Night Dynamite and Friday Night Rampage, as well as television specials, including Battle of the Belts. The company also has two supplementary online streaming programs, Dark and Elevation. Major championship defenses also occur at the promotion's periodic pay-per-view events.

Men

Singles
At the top of AEW's championship hierarchy for male wrestlers is the AEW World Championship. It is held by first-time champion MJF, who defeated Jon Moxley at Full Gear on November 19, 2022, in what was MJF's Casino Poker Chip cash-in match.

Secondary titles for male wrestlers include the AEW International Championship and the AEW TNT Championship.  The International Championship has a special attribute in that it can be contested in other promotions outside of AEW. It is held by first-time title holder Orange Cassidy, who defeated Jeff Jarrett to become inaugural International champion on the March 15, 2023, episode of Dynamite.  The TNT Championship is a television championship that is held by Powerhouse Hobbs, who is in his first reign. He defeated Wardlow by technical knockout in a Falls Count Anywhere match on the March 8, 2023, episode of Dynamite. 

The FTW Championship is a tertiary title that is promoted as an unsanctioned "renegade" championship. It is held by first-time champion Hook, who defeated Ricky Starks on July 27, 2022, at Dynamite: Fight for the Fallen.

Tag Team
The AEW World Tag Team Championship is AEW's traditional tag team title, being contested by teams of two wrestlers. It is held by first time champions The Gunns (Austin Gunn and Colten Gunn). They defeated The Acclaimed (Anthony Bowens and Max Caster) on the February 8, 2023, episode of Dynamite.

The AEW World Trios Championship is a six-man tag team championship, contested by teams of three wrestlers, referred to as trios. It is held by first time champions The House of Black (Malakai Black, Brody King, and Buddy Matthews), who defeated The Elite (Kenny Omega, Matt Jackson, and Nick Jackson) on March 5, 2023, at Revolution.

Women  
At the top of AEW's championship hierarchy for female wrestlers is the AEW Women's World Championship. It is held by first-time champion Jamie Hayter, who initially won the interim championship by defeating Toni Storm at Full Gear on November 19, 2022. She was later declared the official champion on the November 23 episode of Dynamite after Thunder Rosa relinquished the lineal championship, as she was not able to defend the lineal title due to a back injury incurred in late August; Storm's interim reign was also retroactively made an official reign.

The secondary title for female wrestlers is the AEW TBS Championship, which is also a television championship. It is held by Jade Cargill, who defeated Ruby Soho in a tournament final to become the inaugural champion on January 5, 2022, on the TBS debut of Dynamite.

Current champions

Men's division
Singles

Tag Team

Women's division

See also
 Grand Slam (professional wrestling)
 Triple Crown (professional wrestling)

References

External links
 Official All Elite Wrestling Website

All Elite Wrestling championships
Professional wrestling champion lists